Asia Muhammad and Laura Siegemund were the defending champions, but Siegemund chose not to participate this year. Muhammad played alongside María José Martínez Sánchez, but lost in the quarterfinals to Alexandra Panova and Amra Sadiković.
Oksana Kalashnikova and Yaroslava Shvedova won the title, defeating Xenia Knoll and Aleksandra Krunić in the final, 6–1, 6–1.

Seeds

Draw

References
 Main Draw

Ricoh Openandnbsp;- Doubles
2016 Women's Doubles